The Flamethrower, Portable, No 2 (nicknamed Lifebuoy from the shape of its fuel tank), also known as the Ack Pack, was a British design of flamethrower for infantry use in the Second World War.

Description
It was a near copy of the German Wechselapparat ("Wex") from 1917.

The Mark 1 was used as a training weapon, while the improved Mark 2 was used in action.
Over 7,000 units were produced from 1943 to 1944. They were ready for service during Operation Overlord (the Allied invasion of Normandy).

The Ack Pack was a harness carrying a doughnut-shaped fuel container with a capacity of 4 Imperial gallons (18 litres) of fuel on the operator's back. In the middle of the "doughnut" was a spherical container holding nitrogen gas as a propellant, which was pressurized to 2,000 lbf/in² (140 Bar). This was sufficient to propel the burning fuel 120 feet (36 metres). A hose from the fuel tank passed to the nozzle assembly which had two pistol grips to hold and aim the spray. The back grip had the trigger.

In some versions the nozzle was fitted with a 10-chambered cylinder which contained the ignition cartridges. These could be fired once, each giving the operator 10 bursts of flame. In practice this gave 10 one-second bursts. It was also possible to spray fuel without igniting it to ensure there was plenty splashed around the target, then fire an ignited burst to light up the whole lot.

At some  the flamethrower was considered heavy.

Gallery

See also
List of flamethrowers

References

World War II infantry weapons of the United Kingdom
Flamethrowers of the United Kingdom
World War II infantry weapons of Australia
Weapons and ammunition introduced in 1943